Ian McGuinness (born 15 October 1953) is a former Australian rules footballer who played with Melbourne and Fitzroy in the Victorian Football League (VFL).

Notes

External links 

1953 births
Australian rules footballers from Victoria (Australia)
Melbourne Football Club players
Fitzroy Football Club players
Living people